Anglo-American School may refer to:

 Anglo-American School of Moscow (includes a branch in St. Petersburg)
 Anglo-American School of Sofia
 Anglo-American School of St. Petersburg (branch of the school in Moscow)
 Anglo American School in Tres Ríos, Costa Rica
 Anglo American School of Stockholm (now Stockholm International School)
 Anglo American School Prescott in Arequipa, Peru